Sarasota Metropolis FC is a soccer club competing in the USL League Two. 2019 was their debut season.

Year-by-year

References

USL League Two teams
2019 establishments in Florida
2021 disestablishments in Florida
Association football clubs established in 2019
Association football clubs disestablished in 2021
Soccer clubs in Florida
Sports in Sarasota County, Florida